The 2007 Women's African Nations Championship was the 13th edition of the Women's African Volleyball Championship organised by Africa's governing volleyball body, the Confédération Africaine de Volleyball (CAVB). It was held in Nairobi, Kenya, from 5 to 11 September 2007.

Originally planned to be hosted by Uganda, the tournament changed hosts on 9 August 2007, when the CAVB announced Kenya as the hosts due to Uganda's venue not being ready in time for the tournament. Nairobi was selected as the city

Kenya won the championship defeating Algeria in the final, while Tunisia defeated Egypt to finish third.

Competing nations
The following national teams have confirmed participation:

Venue

Format
The tournament is played in two stages. In the first stage, the participants are divided in two groups. A single round-robin format is played within each group to determine the teams' group position (as per procedure below). The top two teams in each group advance to the second stage, the remaining teams finish the tournament ranked (5th to 10th) according to the pool standing procedure (below).

In the second stage, the two best teams of each group progress to the semifinals, winners advance to the final and losers advance to the third place match.

Pool standing procedure
 Match points (win = 2 points, loss = 1 point)
 Number of matches won
 Sets ratio
 Points ratio

Pool composition
The drawing of lots was held in Nairobi, Kenya on 4 September.

Group stage
 All times are East Africa Time (UTC+03:00).

Group A

|}

|}

Group B

|}

|}

Final round
 All times are East Africa Time (UTC+03:00).

Semi finals

|}

3rd Place

|}

Final

|}

Final standing
Tournament winner qualify for the 2007 FIVB World Cup.

Source: CAVB.

Awards

MVP
 Dorcas Nakhomicha Ndasaba
Best Setter
 Janet Wanja
Best Receiver
 Nawal Mansouri
Best Digger
 Milderd Odwako

Best Scorer
 Nihel Ghoul
Best Spiker
 Faïza Tsabet
Best Blocker
 Ingy El-Shamy
Best Server
 Mouni Abderrahim

Source: CAVB.

References
 Official CAVB group stage standings.
 Official CAVB group stage results.
 CAVB semifinals report.
 CAVB final and 3rd place report.

2007 Women
African championship, women
Women's Volleyball Championship
2007 in Kenyan sport
International volleyball competitions hosted by Kenya